Njurunda is a small village in Sundsvall Municipality, located in Västernorrland County, Sweden. The village is situated at the mouth of the Ljungan river and located about 17 kilometers south of Sundsvall. It is primarily a sleeper town for Sundsvall, with a residential population of about 5,000 households and about 450 small to medium-sized businesses.  The elementary school is Kyrkmons skola, which has about 339 students, most of whom head on to Kvissleby and Nivrenaskolan for their 7th - 9th grades before they finally move on to the secondary schools in Sundsvall.

The town was the seat of the former Nivren rural municipality, which later was swallowed by Sundsvall municipality in the consolidation process during the 1960s. Historically, there have been people living in Njurunda since the 5th century. The population, however, did not grow significantly until the 14th century, but late that century the Black Death halted this growth. Industrialization began around 1830 when several saw mills were established close to the Ljungan, which was used to float logs out to the coast.

The Njurunda area is also home to the ruins of a 12th-century church.

Notable persons
Fredrik Modin – Hockey player
Henrik Zetterberg – Hockey player
Lars Dahlqvist – Skier
Fredrik Wikingsson – Journalist
Sebastian Lauritzen – Hockey player
Mathias Månsson – Hockey player

See also
Njurunda Court District

References

External links
Njurunda -  Tourist site

Populated places in Sundsvall Municipality
Medelpad